The Oceania Handball Champions Cup is an international club championship featuring teams from the Oceania region.

Champions

Club performance

Titles by nations

See also
 Oceania Continent Handball Federation
 Oceania Men's Handball Champions Cup

References

 2009 Poster

Handball competitions in Oceania
Oceania Handball Champions Cup
Sports club competitions
Recurring sporting events established in 2007
Multi-national professional sports leagues